Steven Paul Rooney (born June 28, 1963) is an American former professional ice hockey forward. Rooney played his high school hockey at Canton High School, graduating in 1981. Rooney started his National Hockey League career with the Montreal Canadiens in 1985. He played with the Winnipeg Jets and New Jersey Devils. He went on to win one Stanley Cup with Montreal in 1986. He currently works for Alpha Delta Inc. in Boston. His nephew Kevin 
is also an NHL player, currently playing for the Calgary Flames.

Career statistics

Regular season and playoffs

External links
 

1962 births
Living people
American men's ice hockey forwards
Ice hockey players from Massachusetts
Maine Mariners players
Montreal Canadiens draft picks
Montreal Canadiens players
New Haven Nighthawks players
New Jersey Devils players
People from Canton, Massachusetts
Phoenix Roadrunners (IHL) players
Providence Friars men's ice hockey players
Sherbrooke Canadiens players
Stanley Cup champions
Utica Devils players
Winnipeg Jets (1979–1996) players